Guy Orly Iradukunda (born 21 March 1996) is a Burundian tennis player.

Iradukunda has a career high ATP singles ranking of 610 achieved on 14 January 2019. He also has a career high ATP doubles ranking of 552 achieved on 18 April 2022.

Iradukunda represents Burundi at the Davis Cup, where he has a W/L record of 2–0.

Iradukunda played college tennis at Florida State University.

References

External links

1996 births
Living people
Burundian tennis players
People from Gitega Province
Tennis players at the 2014 Summer Youth Olympics